The Belvidere/Dalton tower is a planned 60-story, 699' tower on the grounds of Boston's Christian Science Center adjacent to the Prudential Tower complex on a small, triangular open space owned by the Christian Science Center above the entrance ramps to the complex's parking garage.  There will also be a mid-rise, 285' tower built across the street on a current parking lot.  The taller tower will be of mixed hotel/residential usage with first-floor retail, while the mid-rise tower will be fully residential with first-floor retail as well.

The buildings have been designed by Henry Cobb of Pei Cobb Freed who also designed Hancock Place, Boston's tallest building.  Upon completion, the Belvidere/Dalton tower will be the third-tallest tower in Boston.  The hotel and residences will be run by the Four Seasons Hotels and Resorts, making Boston one of only a few cities with two or more Four Seasons Hotels.

References

Proposed buildings and structures in Massachusetts
Proposed skyscrapers in the United States
Skyscrapers in Boston